Ryan Francois is a swing dancer, choreographer and actor, who played a central part of the revival of the Lindy Hop
.
Specialising in dances related to the Jazz & Swing era - including the Lindy Hop, Charleston, Tap and Authentic Vernacular Jazz, Ryan has over 30 years dance experience.

Ryan learned from and danced with Frankie Manning as well as Pepsi Bethel, George Lloyd and Mama Lu Parks.

Biography

Choreography for the UK TV shows:
 Strictly Come Dancing
 So You Think You Can Dance (UK Series 1)
 So You Think You Can Dance (UK Series 2)

Founder and artistic director of the dance companies: Swing X-Treme and Zoots and Spangles.

Choreographed the swing dance Jitterbug Stroll (1992).

Appeared in the musical Swing! by Paul Kelly.

Co-choreographer for Feelin In The Mood musical.

Movies

 Malcolm X
 Idlewild
 Swing Kids
 The Polar Express
 Lackawanna Blues
 Shore Leave

Awards

Twice winner of the U.S. Open and American Swing Dance Champion.

Nominated for a Tony Award on Broadway.

References

External links
 
 
 Biography, ryanfrancois.com
  The Real Harlem Globetrotters, TEDxAlbertopolis tedxtalks.ted.com
  Ryan Francois Gives TEDx Talk on Lindy Hop History
  Home Page

British ballroom dancers
British choreographers
British male actors
Living people
British male dancers
Year of birth missing (living people)